Poptún is a municipality in the El Petén department of Guatemala. It covers an area of 1,128 km2, and had a population of 35,663 at the 2002 Census; the latest official estimate (as at mid-2012) was 64,988. It is some 385 km from Guatemala City. Since 1989, Military Zone 23 in Poptún has been the home of the Guatemalan Army's elite Kaibiles special operations force.

Geographic location

Poptún is in the southeast part of Petén Department and communicates with the rest of the Republic of Guatemala via a 100-km highway to Flores.

See also

References

3.

<>https://www.tse.org.gt

acuerdo número 12-2019 - Tribunal Supremo Electoral

Municipalities of the Petén Department